The Agdam Mosque or Juma Mosque is a mosque in the ghost town of Aghdam, Azerbaijan.

History

Construction 
The mosque was built by the architect Karbalayi Safikhan Karabakhi from 1868 to 1870, in the typical style for mosques in the Karabakh region, which included the division of stone columns on the two-story gallery and the use of domed ceilings. Other mosques in this style include Barda Mosque, the Yukhari Govhar Agha Mosque in Shusha, a mosque in the city of Fuzuli and one in the village of Horadiz.

Armenian occupation 
During the First Nagorno-Karabakh war, Agdam was used by Azerbaijani forces to fire BM-21 Grad long-range missiles at the Armenian populace of Stepanakert. Aghdam later came under the control of Armenian forces. After the capture, according to eyewitnesses, the city was plundered, destroyed and burned. The Agdam mosque, the only building left standing in Aghdam,  has been vandalized with graffiti and used as a stable for cattle and swine. A narrative of "barbarous Armenians who turn mosques into pigsties" would become an important component of mobilization in Azerbaijan in the prelude to the 2020 Nagorno-Karabakh war.

In 2009, the Republic of Artsakh began funding measures to preserve Islamic monuments. According to Artsakh officials the surroundings of the Agdam mosque were cleaned from the rubble and fenced in 2010. The RFE/RL journalist Stepan Lohr, who visited Agdam in 2011, posted photos of the mosque with no roof, and what he described as "the neglected and damaged interior of Agdam's once-glorious mosque".

After Second Nagorno-Karabakh war 
Following Azerbaijan's victory in the Second Nagorno-Karbakah war, it regained the district of Agdam through the 2020 Nagorno-Karabakh ceasefire agreement on 20 November 2020. Three days later, president Ilham Aliyev and first lady Mehriban Aliyeva visited the ruins of the city and the Agdam mosque. Aliyev gifted a Quran from Mecca to the mosque.

After the ceding of Agdam back to Azerbaijan, the first Friday prayer in 28 years was held in the mosque by the last imam of the mosque and Azerbaijani soldiers.

See also 
 Culture of Azerbaijan

References 

Mosques completed in 1870
19th-century mosques
Mosques in Azerbaijan
Buildings and structures in Aghdam
Karbalayi Safikhan Karabakhi buildings and structures